Opus incertum (irregular work) was an ancient Roman construction technique, using irregularly shaped and randomly placed uncut stones or fist-sized tuff blocks inserted in a core of opus caementicium.

Initially it consisted of more careful placement of the caementa (rock fragments and small stones mixed with concrete), making the external surface as plain as possible. Later the external surface became  plainer still by reducing the amount of concrete and choosing more regular small stones. When the amount of concrete between stones is particularly reduced, it is defined as opus quasi reticulatum. Used from the beginning of the 2nd century BC until the mid-1st century BC, it was later largely superseded by opus reticulatum.

Vitruvius, in De architectura (Ten books on engineering), favours opus incertum, deriding opus reticulatum as more expensive and structurally inferior, since cracks propagate more easily.

See also

Roman construction techniques